Pavić or Pavič is a South Slavic surname, common in Croatia and Serbia. It is derived from the personal name Pavao/Pavo (related to English Paul), by means of patronymic-forming suffix -ić (-ič in Slovenia).

It is among the most common surnames in two counties of Croatia.

It may refer to:
Ante Pavić (born 1989), Croatian tennis player
Armin Pavić (1844–1914), Croatian literary historian and politician
Josip Pavić (born 1982), Croatian water polo player
Mate Pavić (born 1993), Croatian tennis player
Milan Pavić (1914–1986), Croatian photographer
Milorad Pavić (writer) (1929–2009), Serbian writer
Milorad Pavić (footballer) (1921–2005), Serbian football coach
Nikola Pavić (1898–1976), Croatian writer
Ninoslav Pavić, Croatian entrepreneur
Smiljan Pavič (born 1980), Slovenian professional basketball player
Siniša Pavić (born 1933), Serbian writer
Vlasta Pavić (born 1955), Croatian politician

References

Croatian surnames
Serbian surnames
Patronymic surnames
Surnames from given names